New Cross Stadium, Hornshay Street, Old Kent Road, in South East London was opened in the early 1900s as an athletic stadium but was mainly used for greyhound racing and speedway. The ground was adjacent to The Old Den, the then home of Millwall F.C. and was used as a training ground by the club when they did not have facilities of their own. The track was often referred to as 'The Frying Pan'. It was built inside the greyhound track and had banking all the way round. At the time of its closure in 1969 the stadium had a capacity of 26,000. The stadium was demolished in 1975.

Stock car racing 
The birth of oval track stock car racing in the UK and the first ever BriSCA Formula One Stock Car Racing took place at the New Cross Stadium, London on Good Friday, 16 April 1954. The final was won by car 11, Chevalier D'Orgeix. Racing continued here until 1956. Three meetings also took place in 1968 whilst Harringay was being revamped.

During 1966 racing at the stadium was promoted by Spedeworth International and had its own team, the London Sparrows, who also had Wimbledon Stadium as its home track.
The London Sparrows team included Del Stickings, Dave Pierce, Graham North, Johnny Melia, Ken Lambert, John O’Hagon, John Watts, Les Collins, Todd Sweeney and Harry Andrews.

Speedway 

The New Cross Lambs (1934–35), then the New Cross Tamers (1936) speedway teams raced there before the second world war. The New Cross Rangers speedway team rode at the venue from 1937 to 1963. The New Cross club colours were a black Maltese cross on a burnt orange background.  The significance of the cross was purely down to the  'Cross' in the team's name.  The colours were brought with the team from Crystal Palace when promoter Fred Mockford transferred the whole operation. The official speedway track length was 262 yards from 1934 until 1953, when the track reopened in 1959 until its final closure in 1963 the official speedway track length was 278 yards.

On 28 August 1935, English rider Tom Farndon was involved in an accident with Lambs team mate Ron Johnson in a second half scratch race final. Farndon collided with Johnson which hurled him through the air and saw him land head first on the track (some reports say that he hit the outside fence before hitting the track). He died two days later on 30 August in Miller General Hospital in Greenwich, without regaining consciousness. Farndon had won the Star Riders' Championship (the forerunner to the Speedway World Championship) in 1933. He had also won the London Riders' Championship in 1934 and 1935 when a member of the Lambs.

In an era when death in speedway racing was generally accepted due to the relative lack of safety, Farndon was the only rider to die as a result of a crash at New Cross Stadium.

It was the filming site of the 1949 film Once a Jolly Swagman (released as Maniacs on Wheels in the US) starring Dirk Bogarde as a speedway rider and Sid James as the team promoter.

Greyhound racing 
The greyhound track was constructed and had opened by June 1933, it was small compared to the average London track and the racing was initially independent (unaffiliated to a governing body). The track was a very tight circumference of 354 yards with a surface of peat, short straights of 86 yards and heavily banked bends. The stadium could accommodate 25,000 people.

Before the start of the war the stadium became fully licensed with the National Greyhound Racing Club (NGRC) with the first meeting under rules taking place in January 1938. The Greyhound Racing Association (GRA) also took a controlling interest during 1938.  Early trainers included Albert Bedford, John 'Jack' Kennedy’, Bill Smith and Harry Spoor. In 1939 the track introduced the Berkeley Cup over 415 yards as their principal event and it soon became a prominent race on the open race circuit.

After the war Totalisator turnover figures peaked at £3,095,736. The healthy bank balance of the New Cross Greyhounds Ltd Company and the GRA allowed the construction of three new covered stands, two on the home straight and one on the back straight. Restaurant buffet bars, tea buffet bars and licensed bars were to be found in all three enclosures.

In 1946 a new competition called the Greenwich Cup was introduced at the track. The hare system used was a 'Sumner' and the kennel facilities for the New Cross trainers were situated at nearby Silwood Street within ten minutes walking distance of the track.

Trainer Jack Tallantire joined the track in 1952 and Joe Pickering experienced great success that included a double English/Scottish Grand National win by Prince Lawrence in 1954 and 1955. Pickering also lifted the Trafalgar Cup with Our Tim II. A third major competition called the Ben
Truman Stakes was introduced in 1962 when the training ranks consisted of Norman Chambers, Sanders, John Shevlin, Smith and Charlie Smoothy.

John Field arrived as the new Racing Manager in the 1960s and in August 1968 the usual racing schedule of Thursday and Saturday nights was altered after the introduction of Bookmakers Afternoon Greyhound Service (BAGS) fixtures when the Stamford Bridge closed to greyhound racing.

Closure
The BAGS racing lasted less than one year, when the stadium closed with relatively little notice on 3 April 1969 after difficulties over the lease with landowners British Rail.

The stadium was left derelict for several years until it was demolished in 1975 as part of a plan to redevelop the football ground, although those plans fell through. The site is now a public open space called Bridge House Meadows. Millwall F.C. have since moved to a new site north of the stadium, with houses now occupying the location of their old ground.

Competitions

Greenwich Cup

Berkeley Cup

(415 yards)

Ben Truman Stakes

(1962-67 New Cross), (1969–70 Charlton), (1971-87 Catford)

Track records

External links
Defunct Stockcar Stadiums
Photographs of New Cross as a Stockcar track and pictures of it today
 Details of speedway meetings at New Cross

References 

Defunct greyhound racing venues in the United Kingdom
Sports venues in London
Defunct speedway venues in England
Demolished buildings and structures in London
Sports venues demolished in 1975
Defunct sports venues in London
New Cross
Defunct greyhound racing venues in London
Demolished sports venues in the United Kingdom
Greyhound racing in London